Archdeacon (oculus episcopi) is an ecclesiastical below directly below bishop who may be assigned an archdeaconry in many Christian Churches.

Archdeacon may also refer to:

Places 
 Archdeacon Meadow, cricket ground in Gloucester, England, UK

People 
 Dan Archdeacon (1954–2015), American mathematician
 Ernest Archdeacon (1863–1950), French lawyer of Irish descent
 Mark Archdeacon (born 1989), Scottish football striker
 Maurice Archdeacon (1898–1954), American baseball center-fielder who played for the Chicago White Sox
 Owen Archdeacon (born 1966), Scottish football left-winger

See also
 Deacon (disambiguation)